POB or Pob may refer to:
 Parti Ouvrier Belge (Belgian Workers Party), forerunner of the Socialist Party (Belgium)
 Place of birth
 Pob, central character of Pob's Programme, a British children's TV programme (ran 1985–1990)
 Patrick O'Brian, novelist and author
 Poblacion or Pop, a term for the central business district of a Philippine city
 Pope Field (IATA: POB), Fayetteville, North Carolina, U.S., a military air base
 Positive Organizational Behavior, an application of psychology
 Professional Oversight Board, independent oversight of professional organizations in the United Kingdom
 Personnel on board, an abbreviation in oil and gas exploration and production and in shipbuilding
 "Pilot on board", by which the time of the pilot's boarding the ship is understood
 Person overboard, a gender-neutral equivalent of the expression "Man overboard"
 "Pob", an episode of Folklore
 “Pop off Boyz” Glassboro New Jersey street gang started in 2009